Tripuraneni Ramaswamy (1887–1943), also known as Tripuraneni Ramaswamy, was a lawyer, poet, playwright and reformer active among the Telugu-speaking people. He was popularly known as Kaviraju (the "king of poets"), a title given to him by the Andhra Mahasabha in 1929.

Ramaswamy was part of a growing movement in India to reassess the culture of India. This movement included such people as Ram Mohan Roy, Ishwar Chandra Vidyasagar, Ranade, Dayananda Saraswati, Kandukuri Veeresalingam and Gurazada Apparao.

Childhood and early years 
Ramaswamy was born in the village of Angaluru in the Krishna District (present-day Andhra Pradesh) into a family of farmers. At the age of 23, he passed his Matriculation Examination. In the same year Ramaswamy wrote two plays: Karempudi Kadanam, based on the Palanadu battle, and Kurukshetra Sangramam, based on the Mahabharata war. In 1911, Ramaswamy joined the Noble College at Bandar to study for the Intermediate Course. In those years he displayed his literary skills and prodigious memory in his Avadhanam.

In 1914, Ramaswamy went to Britain and studied law as well as English Literature and modern European culture in Dublin. During this time, Ramaswamy wrote to Krishna Patrika, a Telugu weekly appealing to Indians to support the Home Rule movement started by Annie Besant. He pleaded for India's independence. Ramaswamy wrote many patriotic songs during the independence movement.

After returning to India, Ramaswamy practiced law for some years, mostly in Tenali town. However, his main activity was directed towards social reforms. He launched a full-scale attack on casteism and the social injustices resulting from it.

Literary career and public life
Ramaswamy chose literary writing as the vehicle for expressing his rationalist thoughts, and he worked with his close friend Unnava Lakshminarayana, who was a renowned Telugu Brahmin Brahmo leader.

His poetic work Kuppuswamy Satakam reveals the theme of social revolution and talks about social evils, blind faith and indignity to man. In his other works such as Sambhukavadha, Suthashrama geethaalu, Dhoortha maanava, Khooni, Bhagavadgita, Rana Pratap and Kondaveeti pathanam, Ramaswamy made a rational analysis of dogmas prescribed by ancient classics and the injustice these dogmas did to people belonging to the lower social orders. Moreover, Ramaswamy attacked discriminatory practices and fought against the idea of untouchability.

Ramaswamy was against the traditional Hindu marriage ceremony which resulted in burdensome expenditure, especially among the poor. He prepared a simple procedure in Telugu called Vivaha Vidhi. He officiated at many marriages. 

Ramaswamy was a patriot even when he was a student. He wrote a patriotic play Rana Pratap, which was proscribed by the British government. He was an ardent lover of the Telugu language and culture and was proud of their history. He was an educationist and was a member of the senate of the Andhra University for three terms. Ramaswamy was awarded many honors and was popularly known as 'Kaviraju', a title conferred on him.

The Indian government issued a commemorative postage stamp with his picture in 1987, his centenary year.

Children
Among his children were Tripuraneni Gopichand, who left his own mark on the Telugu literature.

References

Bibliography

 Ramaswamy Tripuraneni (1887–1943), Luminaries of 20th Century, Part 2, Potti Sreeramulu Telugu University, Hyderabad, 2005, pp: 552–3.
 
 

1887 births
1943 deaths
Telugu writers
Indian social reformers
Academic staff of Andhra University
Poets from Andhra Pradesh
Telugu poets
People from Krishna district
Indian male poets
20th-century Indian poets
Indian male dramatists and playwrights
20th-century Indian dramatists and playwrights
Activists from Andhra Pradesh
Dramatists and playwrights from Andhra Pradesh
20th-century Indian male writers